Dorothea Maria Lösch (1730 – 2 February 1799), was a Swedish master mariner, known for the incident during the Russo-Swedish War (1788–90) in which she commandeered a Swedish ship during a crisis. She was the first female in Sweden to be given the rank of Kapten in the Swedish Navy (approximately the equivalent of lieutenant commander in the British Navy). Her name has also been spelled Losch and Läsch.

Dorothea Maria Lösch was the daughter of the goldsmith Henrik Jakob Losch from Stockholm and Dorothea Maria Beyms and married in 1756 to the Finnish sea captain Mårten Johan Thesleff: her spouse's name was also spelled Theslöf or Theslef. She had eleven children during her marriage. She was the author of a medical book of how to treat smallpox, Beskrivning af et bepröfvat medel emot Kopp-ärr (Stockholm, 1765).

Dorothea Maria Lösch took over and commanded the ship Armida to safety after its officers had been killed or abandoned it during the Battle of Svensksund on 9 July 1790. For this act, she was awarded with the rank of a master mariner of the Swedish fleet, something unique for a woman of this period. Although this was a purely honorary, ceremonial title, she was nevertheless the first woman in such a position.

See also 
 Brita Hagberg
 Margareta von Ascheberg

References 
 Anteckningar om svenska qvinnor
 Wilhelmina Stålberg: Anteckningar om svenska qvinnor (Notes on Swedish women) (Swedish)
 Ann Öhrberg (2001). Vittra fruntimmer. Författarroll och retorik hos frihetstidens kvinnliga författare. Stockholm: Gidlunds Förlag. 
 Kvinnan inom svenska litteraturen intill år 1893. En bibliografi /
 https://web.archive.org/web/20140220210415/http://www.mesterton.net/~d637989/juusten/t5368.htm

Swedish military officers
1730 births
1799 deaths
Women in 18th-century warfare
Women in war in Sweden
18th-century Swedish scientists
18th-century Swedish military personnel
People of the Russo-Swedish War (1788–1790)
18th-century women scientists
18th-century Swedish writers